Wacław Wójcik (19 November 1919 – 28 December 1997) was a Polish racing cyclist. He won the Tour de Pologne in 1948 and 1952.

References

External links

1919 births
1997 deaths
Polish male cyclists